Velchevo refers to the following places in Bulgaria:

 Velchevo, Lovech Province
 Velchevo, Veliko Tarnovo Province